Thomas Carr may refer to:

Arts and entertainment
 Tom Carr (artist) (born 1956), Spanish-American artist
 Thomas Carr (artist) (1909–1999), British artist
 Tommy Carr (radio), actor on the radio show Magic Island
 Thomas Carr (director) (1907–1997), American film and television director
 Thomas Carr (publisher) (1780–1849), music publisher from the early United States

Politics
 Tom Carr (politician), City Attorney of Boulder, Colorado
 Thomas Carr (MP), British Tory MP for Chichester, 1708–1710

Religion
 Thomas Carr (archbishop of Melbourne) (1839–1917), Archbishop of Melbourne
 Thomas Carr (bishop) (1788–1859), Bishop of Bombay, 1836–1851

Sports
 Tom Carr (American football) (born 1942), American football player
 Tom Carr (footballer) (born 1978), Australian Rules footballer
 Tommy Carr (Australian footballer) (1882–1963), Australian rules footballer
 Tommy Carr (Gaelic footballer) (born 1961), Gaelic football player for Dublin
 Thomas Carr (rugby league), rugby league footballer who has played in the 2010s
 Thomas Carr (sport shooter) (1905–1955), American Olympic shooter

Science and technology
 Thomas Carr (astronomer) (1917–2011), an American astronomer at the University of Florida
 Thomas Carr (paleontologist), vertebrate paleontologist

Other
 Thomas D. Carr (1846–1870), American thief, arsonist, murderer and self-confessed serial killer
 Thomas Carr Farmstead Site (Keeler Site RI-707), historic archaeological site in Rhode Island
 Thomas Carr College in Tarneit, Victoria, Australia